Alev Demirkesen (born 1964 in Istanbul), is a Turkish artist who works in the field of Turkish decorative arts. Her works include ceramic decoration, miniature and illumination.

She believes that when something breaks it is no longer of the same value.

Early life and education 
Alev Demirkesen was born in 1964 in Istanbul. She attended the Mimar Sinan University, Department of Fine Arts and eventually graduated from there. She did her masters in the same department at the same university.

She was educated in the Turkish decorative arts of miniature, illumination (Tezhip), drawing and ceramic decorations. She received education of these arts inside and outside the university from Neşe Aybey, Tahsin Aykutalp, Emin Barın, Cahide Keskiner and Kerim Silivrli.

Career 
In 2003, she started teaching at the Sakarya University, in the Traditional Turkish Arts Department.

Exhibitions 
Demirkesen has participated in group exhibitions both in Turkey and internationally and has also held personal exhibitions.

Personal exhibitions 
 1st Personal Exhibition:
 2nd Personal Exhibition:
 3rd Personal Exhibition:
 4th Personal Exhibition:
 5th Personal Exhibition:
 6th Personal Exhibition: Gökyüzü Mektupları, Ramada Istanbul Asia Hotel Art Gallery (22-29 March) 2019
 7th Personal Exhibition: Reng - i Ahenk, Ramada Istanbul Asia Hotel Art Gallery (26 January 2020) 2020
 Alev Demirkesen Solo Sergi 2021

Collaboration exhibitions 
 Bahar-ı Alem, Sakarya University, (-3 April) 2022

References

Citations

Sources 

1964 births
Living people
Turkish women artists
Academy of Fine Arts in Istanbul alumni
20th-century Turkish artists
21st-century Turkish artists
Turkish miniaturists